Mimodiadelia brunnea is a species of beetle in the family Cerambycidae, and the only species in the genus Mimodiadelia. It was described by Breuning in 1970.

References

Desmiphorini
Beetles described in 1970
Monotypic beetle genera